Club Deportivo Federal was a football club based in Tegucigalpa, Honduras.

History
The club was founded August 14, 1935, in the house of Mrs. Idilia Rubio in colonia La Hoya (La Hoya neighborhood) in Tegucigalpa. In the 1940s and 1950s it was one of the big three clubs in Honduras' capital city and the city's clasico was the Federal vs Motagua game.

They were Honduran Amateur League champions in the 1954–55 season.

Achievements
Segunda División
Winners (2): 1973, 1998–99
Runners-up (2): 1967–68, 1978–79

Amateur League
Winners (1): 1953
Runners-up (1): 1952

Francisco Morazán Major League
Winners (3): 1952, 1953, 1962

League performance

Managers
   “Foncho” Uclés
   “Popo” Godoy
  Carlos Padilla Velásquez (1999–2000)
  Carlos de Toro (1999–2000)
  Dennis Allen (1999–2000)

References

External links
 Federal, 78 años de “académicos” (History) – Diaro Más 

 
Defunct football clubs in Honduras
Association football clubs established in 1935
1935 establishments in Honduras